The Smile of the Lamb (translit. Hiuch HaGdi) is a 1986 Israeli drama film directed by Shimon Dotan and based on a novel by David Grossman. It was entered into the 36th Berlin International Film Festival where Tuncel Kurtiz won the Silver Bear for Best Actor.

Cast
 Rami Danon as Laniado
 Iris Hoffman as Shosh
 Makram Khoury as Katzman
 Tuncel Kurtiz as Hilmi
 Dan Muggia as Sheffer

References

External links

1986 films
1980s Hebrew-language films
1986 drama films
Films based on Israeli novels
Films directed by Shimon Dotan
Israeli drama films